Vaughan Edward Savidge (born 6 June 1956) is a former British freelance newsreader for BBC Radio 3, continuity announcer for BBC Radio 4, and formerly a newsreader the World Service. He also performed spoof news items on Armando Iannucci's Charm Offensive.

Early life
Born in Luton, he spent his early years travelling around Africa, Australia and Singapore.

Career
He returned to Britain for a few years with his family, but then gained his first job as a trainee journalist at Radio Television Hong Kong, where he dubbed Kung Fu films including The One Armed Swordsman. Later he joined the British Forces Broadcasting Service in Gibraltar. After a spell working in television in Germany he returned to London in 1996 where he joined Radio 4 as a newsreader, later adding work for Radio 3 and the World Service. In later years Vaughan could only be heard on Radio 3 and Radio 4, before leaving both stations in spring 2018.

Personal life
He lives in Great Bromley, Essex, with his wife Katherine.

References

External links
 BBC profile, with photo

1956 births
BBC Radio 3 presenters
BBC Radio 4
BBC World Service people
British expatriates in Germany
British expatriates in Hong Kong
Living people
People from Tendring (district)
People from Luton
Radio and television announcers